Douglass Junior and Senior High School is a historic school building located at Huntington, Cabell County, West Virginia. Built in 1924, it was the segregation-era high school for African Americans in the city, and replaced the earlier Douglass school building which had been built in 1891, and was named after abolitionist Frederick Douglass.  The school is a three-story building measuring 113 feet wide and 230 feet long.  It is built of red brick, with terra cotta trim, and rests on a concrete foundation.  It closed as a school in 1961, but continued to be used as a school for special education until 1981.  After that it housed educational offices.  It now serves as a community center.

It was listed on the National Register of Historic Places in 1985.

School

Notable alumni
Hal Greer (1936–2018) – First African American athlete at Marshall University. He was a long time star with the Philadelphia 76ers
Carter G. Woodson (1875–1950) – graduated in 1895, from Douglass High School and later served as the school's principal; predecessor school of Douglass Junior and Senior High School.

Notable faculty
Ira De Augustine Reid, prominent Sociologist who led the Atlanta University department after W. E. B. Du Bois.

References

Buildings and structures in Huntington, West Virginia
Defunct schools in West Virginia
Educational institutions disestablished in 1961
Educational institutions disestablished in 1981
Educational institutions established in 1924
Former school buildings in the United States
Historically segregated African-American schools in West Virginia
National Register of Historic Places in Cabell County, West Virginia
1924 establishments in West Virginia
School buildings on the National Register of Historic Places in West Virginia